Beauty and the Geek Australia is an Australian reality television show that follows a group of "Beauties" (women who rely on their attractiveness and outgoing personalities but typically lack intellect) "Geeks" (men who rely on intellect but typically lack the social ability) who must pair up to compete in challenges to survive episodic elimination. The final pair remaining is declared as being "More than a Beauty and a Geek" and wins the grand prize of $100,000.

While a competition, the show is also billed as a social experiment, in which each contestant typically learns from their opposite teammate - both in what trait they lack and in understanding another perspective. During the competition, the contestants live in a mansion, with the beauties competing in challenges of intellect, with the assistance of their "geek", and the geeks competing in challenges regarding social ability, with the assistance of their "beauty".

The series first aired on the Seven Network for six seasons between 2009 and 2014, with Bernard Curry hosting the first four series and James Tobin hosting for the fifth and sixth seasons. On 16 September 2020, the series was revived for a seventh season by Nine Network with Sophie Monk as the new host, and the season premiered on 11 July 2021. On 15 September 2021, the series was renewed for an eighth season with Monk returning as host.

Format
The format for Beauty and the Geek is as follows:
Challenges: Each episode, the teams will compete in challenges. The beauties are challenged academic subjects, while the geeks competing in a challenge regarding their social ability, or the challenge can involve the pairs working as a team. The winning Beauty and Geek of their respective challenge win immunity for their team, and in Nine's revival, they also win either a date or a makeover.
Nominations: Following the challenges, in Seven's version, the winning teams must both name another team to be nominated for Elimination. In Nine's revival, the two bottom-performing teams are nominated for elimination by the Host.
Eliminations Room: In the elimination room, the nominated teams are tested once again in a quiz regarding the episode's challenges, each other, and the experience overall, alongside physical challenges. The team with the fewer points or correct answers is eliminated from the competition.

The last team remaining wins the competition and wins a cash prize.

Series overview

Season 1 (2009)

Teams 
Xenogene later appeared in an audition episode of The X Factor singing "Thriller". He also appeared in the several episodes of the second season of the same series; in a pool when the Geeks were being cabana boys and in crowd scenes at the Beauty Pageant, Bachelor Auction and Wedding Ceremonies.

Episode progress 

  The contestants won the competition.
  The contestants claimed the runner-up position in the competition.
  The contestant won the challenge and their pair was safe from elimination.
  The contestant's partner won the challenge and they were safe from elimination.
  The contestant did not win the challenge and neither were they nominated but their pair was safe from elimination.
  The contestant and their partner were nominated and survived elimination.
  The contestant and their partner were nominated and were eliminated from the competition.
  The contestants did not compete in the week.

Challenges and eliminations 
Episode 1: 8 October 2009
The beauties met the geeks for the first time, and are put into teams. The beauties had to teach a 5th grade class either science, mathematics, history or geography. The geeks had to perform a rap song for a nightclub audience including guest judges Molly Meldrum and Jessica Mauboy. There was no elimination, much to the surprise of the contestants.

Episode 2: 15 October 2009
The beauties studied the anatomy of the body. Meanwhile, the geeks practised relaxing massage techniques, including developing their own signature move, which they put into practice on the beauties.

Episode 3: 22 October 2009
For many of the geeks, it was their first opportunity to go on a date when they embarked on speed dating. The beauties became budding rocket scientists when they attempted to build and launch a rocket from scratch.

Episode 4: 29 October 2009
The geeks are create a race day outfit for their beauties, including choosing a dress for dumaaaa and making the fascinator from scratch, to impress guest judges, milliner Pater Jago and Kate Waterhouse (daughter of horse trainer Gai Waterhouse). Meanwhile, the beauties brushed up on their current affairs knowledge to present a speech on a newsworthy topic.

Episode 5: 5 November 2009
The boys got a makeover in the hopes of improving their confidence. This week also contained the first team challenge, with the beauties and geeks teaming up for a special soap opera challenge with the help of Home and Away stars Ada Nicodemou and Luke Jacobz.

Episode 6: 12 November 2009
The Beauties become tour guides for a night at the museum, and the Geeks host a radio Love Hotline.

Episode 7: 19 November 2009
The Geeks teach a fitness class while the Beauties build a billy cart from scratch.

Episode 8 (Finale): 26 November 2009
The teams pair up for their own Amazing Race-inspired challenge. They receive clues and work together to track down three eliminated contestants scattered throughout Sydney - the last team back at the mansion would be instantly eliminated. Then the final elimination room quiz was held for the $100,000 prize.

Ratings

Season 2 (2010)
The second season began recording on 9 August 2010, with the first episode going to air on 21 October 2010. There were six episodes in total. The first and last ones were one and a half hours instead of just one hour.

The season was won by the pairing of Michael and Jessie.

Teams 
The second season of Beauty and the Geek Australia features the same contestant structure as the first season, with one big twist; one of the "Beauties" (Ellie) is actually a twin (Brooke; who also competes). In each challenge only one of the twins was allowed to compete and only that twin can study for that challenge. Also, Xenogene from season 1 was a background "Where's Wally" in at least six episodes. In no apparent order, the contestants for the second season are as follows.

Winners are in bold

Episode progress 

  The contestant won the competition.
  The contestants claimed the runner-up position in the competition.
  The contestant won the challenge and their pair was safe from elimination.
  The contestant's partner won the challenge and they were safe from elimination.
  The contestant won immunity and was safe from elimination.
  The contestant's partner won immunity and they were safe from elimination.
  The contestant did not win the challenge or immunity and neither were they nominated but they was safe from elimination.
  The contestant and their partner survived elimination.
  The contestant was eliminated from the competition.
  The contestant did not compete in the week.
A ⊃ or a ⋑ indicates that the winning team had the power to nominate a non winning / non immune team for elimination; a ⊂ or ⋐ indicates the team who received it.

Challenges and eliminations 
Episode 1: 21 October 2010
The Geeks apply their knowledge of beauty and fashion to design and dress their Beauties in a handmade bikini which best reflects who the Geeks are for a pageant before a panel of former beauty pageant winners, Miss Universe Australia 2009 Rachael Finch, Miss World 1972 Belinda Green and Miss Australia 1954 Shirley Bliss. The Beauties build a flying device for their Geeks to fly.

Episode 2: 28 October 2010
The Beauties have to handle creepy-crawlies in a challenge that incorporates mathematics, while the Geeks have to stand in as Cabana Boys at a famous Star City hotel. In the creepy-crawlies challenge, the beauties had to transport bugs of different values to their own bowl and whoever scored 100 points worth of bugs won the challenge. Later, a second challenge was announced where beauties can gain immunity by eating a live witchetty grub. However, this winner is unable to nominate a pair for elimination.

Episode 3: 4 November 2010
The beauties have to take a Legally Blonde style challenge that involves law with Barbara Holborow as the preside judge, while the Geeks have to pose nude for a calendar in Who magazine. In the Legally Blonde showcase challenge, the beauties were given a topic and were announced if they were for or against. Between the two beauties, the judge would declare a winner. Then out of the three, there was a final winner. Later, Kara's feelings about Daniel kissing Ellie finally came out.

Episode 4: 11 November 2010
The Geek make-over special involved style, fashion, hair and personality. The geeks changed from geek to chic as they transformed very differently. The beauties had to auction off their geek and in due with the auction, the got a date. The beauties were given tasks to set the geeks to do, if not so, they would be eliminated. No one got eliminated that week.

Episode 5: 18 November 2010
The Beauties get down and dirty as they learn about history, where the Geeks have to form a boy band with Justice Crew in a local place. In the archeological dig challenge, the Beauties had to get dirty in a mud pool with items inside and needed to put them in year order. The Geeks were introduced to Justice Crew and were taught dance moves to perform to a live audience. The winner was declared by Justice Crew who they felt put a lot of energy into it.

Episode 6: 25 November 2010
The beauties had to do a spelling bee and the geeks were to declare their Cinderella with a shoe fitting, finding the correct sized shoe for their beauty among a pile of other shoes. Then the race was on with the geeks carrying their beauties in chariots to the finish line, in which Daniel and Donna were eliminated. A surprise came which no one expected, a challenge in which the beauties were a beautiful bride to their groomy geeks. The audience at the wedding voted for the best vow, dance and speech, where Marlon and Ellynie-May were eliminated. Michael and Jessie won the second season of Beauty and the Geek Australia, beating Thomas and Tamika with a score of 3-2 in the elimination room.

Ratings

Season 3 (2011)
The third season began airing on 22 September 2011, with the first episode being 90 minutes.

Teams 
The third season of Beauty and the Geek Australia features the same contestant structure as the first season, with one big twist; one of the "Beauties" is a male and one of the geeks is a female.

Episode progress 

  The contestant won the competition.
  The contestants claimed the runner-up position in the competition.
  The contestant won the challenge and was safe from elimination.
  The contestant's partner won the challenge and they were safe from elimination.
  The contestant won immunity and was safe from elimination.
  The contestant's partner won immunity and they were safe from elimination.
  The contestant did not win the challenge or immunity and neither were they nominated but they was safe from elimination.
  The contestant and their partner survived elimination.
  The contestant was eliminated from the competition.
  The contestant did not compete in the week.
  The team was seen as a replacement for the first eliminated team but did not compete in the week.
  The contestant was individually nominated for elimination and survived.
  The contestant quit the competition.
  The contestant was reentered as a replacement due to the withdrawal of another contestant.
  The contestant was nominated and returned to the competition.
  The contestant was nominated but did not return to the competition.
  The contestant was eligible to return to the competition but was not nominated.
  The contestant's partner was eligible to return to the competition but was not nominated.
  The contestant was ineligible to return to the competition and therefore could not be nominated.
A ⊃ or a ⋑ indicates that the winning team had the power to nominate a non winning / non immune team for elimination; a ⊂ or ⋐ indicates the team who received it and faced elimination.
A ⊃ or ⋑ indicates that the winning team was initially eligible to nominate a non winning / non immune team for elimination however did not.
A ∪ indicates that the team was automatically nominated for elimination.

Notes

In the grand finale, Troy & Mackenzie announced their engagement. Their team mates bonded and Jimmy asked Helen out on a date, but Helen informed Jimmy that she was already taken by a guy in the Netherlands. Lachlan and Jordan started dating beyond the game. It was unclear what happened to Gilbert and Dolly.

Challenges and eliminations 
Episode 1: 22 September 2011
The geeks applied their knowledge in a "Fashion-atomy" challenge, which involved painting on their beauties specific items of clothing and being judged by Camilla Franks. The beauties then did a "Round-the-World" challenge by matching selected foods to the country that they are associated with on a large map of the world. Helen and Troy were first introduced.

Episode 2: 29 September 2011
The beauties took part in a zoology challenge, in which they put their hand into five crates with an animal inside, feeling it, and then naming each animal. The beauties were then offered immunity in a challenge where a disk was placed in a crate with 50 000 cockroaches inside, and the beauties had to pick up the disk with their mouth. The geeks took part in a "What's Your Number?" challenge, which had them approaching a female (a male for Helen) and asking for their number by flirting and finding interests.

Episode 3: 6 October 2011
The beauties and the geeks take part in a hero challenge where they each had to shoot a ball of paint at pictures of geek and beauty heroes respectively, and then name the hero. The geeks later took part in a roller-skating derby challenge in which a Sydney women's roller-derby team would try to knock them over. The last two geeks standing would then have to protect their beauties from falling over.

Episode 4: 13 October 2011
The beauties and geeks return to school as the beauties are assigned to teach a Year 7 class about either physics, chemistry, biology or volcanology. Afterwards the geeks paired up with their beauty to choreograph and perform a cheerleading routine, with the top two couples having to compete with a professional cheerleading team.

Episode 5: 20 October 2011
The beauties and geeks posed in a photoshoot which saw many of them strip down into underwear. The couple with the best photo would appear on the cover of the Famous magazine, and the geek of this couple as well as the couple that came second in the challenge would receive a makeover. After Lachlan and Helen's makeover, each of the geeks went out on a date with a female geek (male for Helen) specifically chosen to match their interests, with the beauties having to serve them as waitresses. Afterwards they were given a choice; they had the chance to swap their beauty for their geeky date. After a lot of controversy, none of the geeks turned in their beauty for their date. As a treat there was no elimination for that week.

Episode 6: 27 October 2011
The beauties designed a comic book superhero, and the geeks then had to design and make a costume for this superhero which the beauties would have to wear on a fashion parade. The geeks introduced their partner as they came out, and the beauties then had to describe the powers that their superhero had. Following this challenge the remaining four geeks who didn't have makeovers the previous week had their turn, with some amazing results. Using their new look they participated in a "Full Monty Challenge", involving each of them to perform a short dance dressed as The Village People at a local club with a big finale involving them stripping down to their underwear.

Episode 7: 3 November 2011
The beauties took on a spelling bee based on their respective geek's interest. Each time they misspelled a word their geek would receive an electric shock, and if they got the same word wrong twice in a row they would be knocked out of the challenge. The geeks then took part in a biker race, which had the beauties construct a bike and sidecar for their geeks to ride in, with the first beauty to finish giving their geek an advantage in the race. The geeks were to carry members of the HOGS motorcycle gang in the sidecar, with the geek whose partner finished building the bike first having the advantage of carrying the lightest biker, and the heaviest biker riding in the bike of the geek whose partner finished last. After the race the geeks were offered immunity; the first geek to step forward to have their beauty's name tattooed on their body would go through to next week. Lachlan took the challenge much to everyone's surprise, getting Sarah's name tattooed on his buttocks and consequently causing much drama in the house.

Episode 8: 10 November 2011
The beauties undertook a "Mustering Maths" challenge, which involved them attempting to round up a group of farm animals each with a number or mathematical symbol on them into a small enclosure to make an equation that would equal 60. Later the previously eliminated geeks who did not have the chance to get makeovers re-entered the house, with each of the geeks still in the competition giving them makeovers with a time limit of two hours. The beauties then voted on which made over geek had the biggest improvement, unaware as to which who made over which geek. However, a twist was introduce so that the two winning couples of the week (Gilbert and Jacelle in the Mustering Maths challenge, and Jimmy and Mackenzie in the style challenge) had the power to nominate a couple to return to the mansion, instead of nominating a couple to be eliminated.

Episode 9: 17 November 2011
The geeks were brought into an art studio for a "Woman Appreciation" challenge, in which they had 20 minutes to sketch a naked female model. While they were sketching her, the model kept talking casually about mundane things in her life much to their annoyance, and was generally being very distracting. However, at the end of the challenge they were told that they were not being assessed on how good their artwork is, but how much they listened, and so they were quizzed on things the model said. Afterwards the beauties had to work with their geek to find a figure or icon that represents the "London Look", which the beauty then had to dress up as and represent in a beauty pageant.

Episode 10: 24 November 2011
The geeks and beauties returned to school as they were graded on school subjects such as Science, Home Economics and Physical Education. The couple with the lowest average grade was eliminated, and the remaining three couples would attend the school formal. At the school formal the geeks would stand in a kissing booth and the beauties had to advertise their geeks to other people attending the formal. The couples then participated in a dance battle, and following these two challenges all the attendees had to vote on which couple had the strongest bond. The top two couples from this challenge then went to the elimination room for the final time where the scores were so tight that two tie-breaker rounds were held. The end result was a score of 5-4 with Lachlan and Sarah winning Season 3 of Beauty and the Geek Australia over Julian and Jordan.

Ratings

Season 4 (2012)
The fourth season began airing on 4 October 2012. This season saw some changes, including the theme song. In addition to winning the regular prize, the winner will receive two Holden Barina per one for each winning team member. Also, the nominations and eliminations room were expanded into a bigger size. This season's big twist was that one of the geeks is a secret millionaire, and in week 3 this was revealed to be Nathan. It was also Bernard Curry's last series as a host.

Teams

Episode progress 

  The contestants won the competition.
  The contestants claimed the runner-up position in the competition.
  The contestant won the challenge and their pair was safe from elimination.
  The contestant's partner won the challenge and they were safe from elimination.
  The contestant did not win the challenge but their pair was safe from elimination.
  The contestant and their partner survived elimination.
  The contestant and their partner was eliminated.
  The contestants did not compete in the week.
  The contestants were brought back into the competition.
  The contestants were nominated but did not return to the competition.
  The contestant won immunity and was safe from elimination.
  The contestant's partner won immunity and they were safe from elimination.

Notes

In the grand final of Beauty and the Geek Australia season 4, it involved both the beauties and the geeks to dress as if they are medieval times. Their challenges included the geeks' ability to save their princesses by climbing a rock climbing wall and the beauties having to recite a sonnet and kiss a frog. Kristy and Jason were eliminated after this. The next lot of couples then attended a ball in which the couples had to tell the audience about their time in the mansion together while also dancing in a ballet together. Chontelle and Cody were eliminated in this challenge which then left Millie and Chard versus Dane and Alin to compete for the prize.

In the final round of Beauty and the Geek, the couples went up against each other in a quiz to see which couple knew the most about each other. Amid some controversy over the easiness of questions put to Chard & Millie, compared to Alin's & Dane's quiz questions, Chard & Millie were crowned the winners of Beauty and the Geek 2012.

Challenges and eliminations

Ratings

Season 5 (2013)
The twist in Season 5 saw 9 beauties and 8 geeks sent to live on a tropical island of Fiji with no mansion and no luxuries. An extra beauty, Courtenay, joined the team of Alex and Bella after Alex won the first challenge. This season also had two New Zealand contestants, Bella and Zac, as was advertised earlier in the year.

Teams

Episode progress 

Upon winning the challenge in Week 1, Alex who was originally teamed with Bella received a surprise package, upon opening it, Courtenay was inside, which gave Alex two beauties to compete with. In Week 2 it was revealed he would have to eliminate one of his beauties, he decided to eliminated Bella, forming the official team of Alex & Courtenay.
Instead of the usual power to nominate two teams for elimination, instead the winning teams this week, Zac and Ntula, and Alex and Courtenay, had the power to mix up the couples of two teams. They denied the use of this power, leaving all the teams safe.
In the Episode 6, Kassi & Brandon and Emily & Brett, had to nominate two teams to return to the competition instead of the usual nominating two teams to go home. Kassi & Brandon nominated Courtenay & Alex, while Emily & Brett nominated Erin & Nathan. In the end, Erin & Nathan won the elimination room quiz and returned to the competition.

  The contestants won the competition.
  The contestants claimed the runner-up position in the competition.
  The contestant won the challenge and their pair was safe from elimination.
  The contestant's partner won the challenge and they were safe from elimination.
  The contestant did not win the challenge but their pair was safe from elimination.
  The contestant and their partner survived elimination.
  The contestant and their partner was eliminated.
  The contestant was individually up for elimination and survived.
  The contestant was individually eliminated.
  The contestants did not compete in the week.
  The contestants were brought back into the competition.
  The contestants were nominated but did not return to the competition.
  The contestant withdrew from the competition due to personal reasons.
  The contestant won immunity and was safe from elimination.
  The contestant's partner won immunity and they were safe from elimination.

Challenges and eliminations

Ratings

Season 6 (2014)
This season's twist had 8 Australian Geeks paired up with 8 Las Vegas Beauties for the initial round in Vegas. Then the 7 teams that survived moved back to the new mansion back in Australia where 7 Australian Beauties are introduced to the Geeks. The Geeks must choose which beauty to progress in the competition with. The first episode aired on 9 October 2014.

Teams 
Each Geek is listed with their two Beauties, one from Australia and one from Las Vegas, with the first being the Beauty that they progressed in the competition with, and the second being the Beauty eliminated in the second episode. Las Vegas Beauties are marked with a †.

Episode progress 

  The contestants won the competition.
  The contestants claimed the runner-up position in the competition.
  The contestant won the challenge and their pair was safe from elimination.
  The contestant's partner won the challenge and they were safe from elimination.
  The contestant did not win the challenge but their pair was safe from elimination.
  The contestant and their partner survived elimination.
  The contestant and their partner was eliminated.
  The contestant was individually up for elimination and survived.
  The contestant was individually eliminated.
  The contestants did not compete in the week.
  The contestants were brought back into the competition.
  The contestants were nominated but did not return to the competition.
  The contestant withdrew from the competition due to personal reasons.
  The contestant won immunity and was safe from elimination.
  The contestant's partner won immunity and they were safe from elimination.

In episode 1, each geek was partnered with an American Beauty. In episode 2, each of the remaining geeks was also given an Australian beauty (instead of having a challenge winner). At the end of episode 2, each geek had to choose between their American and Australian Beauties to determine who stayed. Nicole won immunity by winning the Beauty challenge that week.
In episode 1, the winning teams had to nominate who they wanted to save, and the remaining teams had to compete in a question round to determine the first couple to be eliminated.
In episode 1, Bowen was the first geek to be eliminated, but before he left the competition he was given the first makeover this season.
In episode 4, on winning the geek challenge, Oliver was the second geek who received his makeover this season.
In episode 5, Tate won a modeling contract by winning the geek challenge.
In episode 8, Nick won the geek challenge and Nicole won the beauty challenge. They were both through to the final quiz, as were their partners. Frances and Oliver competed against Emily and Tate in a third challenge, a spin of a roulette wheel. The game was won by Frances and Oliver, thus eliminating Emily and Tate. The three remaining couples participated in the final quiz, which was won by Candice and Nick. The two remaining couples did not get to finish the quiz, and therefore were all runners-up.

Challenges and eliminations

Ratings

Season 7 (2021)

The seventh season began airing on 11 July 2021, it broadcast for the first time on Nine Network.

Teams

Episode progress 

  The contestants won the competition.
  The contestants claimed the runner-up position in the competition.
  The contestant won the challenge and won a date with their partner.
  The contestant's partner won the challenge and won a date with their partner.
  The contestant did not win the challenge but their pair was safe from elimination.
  The contestant and their partner survived elimination.
  The contestant and their partner was eliminated.
  The contestants were brought back into the competition.
  The contestants competed to return to the competition, but did not succeed.

Challenges and eliminations 

 Notes

Ratings

Season 8 (2022)

The eighth season begins airing on 17 July 2022, for the second time on Nine Network. This season reverted to the original elimination format of a head-to-head quiz between the teams up for elimination.

Teams

Episode progress 

  The contestants won the competition.
  The contestants claimed the runner-up position in the competition.
  The contestant won the challenge and won a date with their partner and/or was safe from elimination.
  The contestant's partner won the challenge and won a date with their partner and/or was safe from elimination.
  The contestant did not win the challenge but their pair was safe from elimination.
  The contestant and their partner survived elimination.
  The contestant and their partner was eliminated.

Challenges and eliminations 

 Notes

Ratings

See also
 The Mole (Australian TV series) – A similar show involving teamwork and also utilizes immunity and quizzes as a method of elimination

References

External links
Official site

2009 Australian television series debuts
2000s Australian reality television series
2010s Australian reality television series
2020s Australian reality television series
Australian dating and relationship reality television series
Australian television series based on American television series
Australian television series revived after cancellation
English-language television shows
Seven Network original programming
Television series by Banijay
Television series by Endemol Australia